Fergus Tiernan (born 3 January 1982) is a former football midfielder who retired from the sport in 2009 at the age of 27.

Football career
Raised in Helensburgh, Tiernan began his career at Scottish Premier League club Aberdeen, and also had spells at Ross County and Dumbarton before his initial decision to retire in January 2009. He made a brief comeback with Queen's Park later in 2009 before changing his mind once again.

Career after football

Having become a firefighter after dropping out of full-time football, Tiernan found it difficult to accommodate his football and work commitments. He retired from professional football at the age of 27 in 2009.

References

External links

Profile at AFC Heritage Trust

1982 births
Living people
People from Helensburgh
Association football midfielders
Scottish footballers
Aberdeen F.C. players
Ross County F.C. players
Dumbarton F.C. players
Queen's Park F.C. players
Scottish Premier League players
Scottish Football League players
Sportspeople from Argyll and Bute